Baso may refer to:

 Baso (island), Indonesia
 Baso language
 Baso Dōitsu or Mazu Daoyi
 Baso Sangqu (born 1968), South African politician
 CFU-Baso, a colony forming unit

See also
 Basso (disambiguation)